Shri Revan Natha, also known as Revan Siddh, Kada Siddha, and, Kaadhsiddheshwar Siddharaj was the 7th or 8th Navnath. He is especially worshipped in western India, where several temples are dedicated to him, and several sampradayas trace their origin to him, the best-known being the Inchegeri Sampradaya.

Etymology

Kada Siddha
According to one account, Revan nath derived the name Kada Siddha from his siddhi, powers:

Kaadhsiddheshwar
According to another account, Revanath settled on the Siddhgiri hill for ascetic practice, living on whatever the jungle, gave him. He became famous known as  Kaadsiddheswar  
 "Kaadha" means a jungle;
 siddha, siddha guru, mean  "one who is accomplished";
 "ishwar" means Shiva, the "Supreme lord".
Meaning "the one who attained supreme realization in a forest".

Biography
Revan Nath was born at the bank of Reva River (Narmada River ), and was brought up at a farmer’s house.

Mahima Siddhi
One morning when he proceeded to his farm, Lord Guru Dattatreya gave him Darshana, revealing himself to Revan Natha. Guru Dattatreya recognised the boy as an Avatara being incarnated on earth and gave him special siddhi, divine powers, called "Mahima". After receiving this siddhi, the farmer’s house flourished with plenty of food grain and prosperity, and Anna Chatra was also started.

Machchindra Natha, the first Nath of the Navnath Sampradaya, visited the village when he came to know about Mahima Siddhi. Machchindra Natha recognised Revan Natha as a Narayana Avatar but warned that if he kept stuck in a cage of popularity due to this Mahima Siddhi, it would create an obstacle in his Avatar Karya. Machchindra Natha prayed to Lord Dattatreya to give the status of Brahma Sanatana to this boy. Revan Natha realised his Satya Swaroopa, and proceeded to work for the welfare of the world, and the upliftment of poor and needy people.

The seven dead children
While on pilgrimage, he arrived at one village by name VITA (Near Sangli, in Maharashtra). In that village, there was a name ceremony function for one Brahmin family. They said Brahmin saw Revan Natha and cordially invited Revan Natha on the holy occasion of the naming ceremony of his son. Revan Natha decided to stay at Brahmin’s residence for a while when Revan Natha saw his love and respect. A strange thing happened on the night that the kid whose name ceremony solemnised suddenly expired over midnight itself. The mother of the dead kid started weeping. Revan Natha heard the voice of her weeping and asked the Brahmin, who is crying, what happened? That Brahmin elucidated all his story to Revan Natha and explained the history of his son that all the kids who took birth at his home were dead and this recently expired kid was his 7th son. After listening to the story Revan Natha interact with himself in his mind that how it could have happened when I was present in the Brahmin’s house! After doing condolence there, Revan Natha assured the Brahmin and straightway approached Lord Shiva and brought Chaitanya of the seven dead kids therefrom. Revan Natha made seven pieces of the dead kid and reinstated the Sanjivan Chaitanya therein, made alive the seven dead kids and gave them rebirth by using spiritual power. The weeping Brahmin family got showered with intense happiness and joy. Shri Revan Natha stayed for some more days in that village and thereafter proceeded for pilgrimage for divine duties i.e. welfare of needy people.

Temples

Several temples are dedicated to Revan Nath.

Siddhagiri Math

Revananath is considered to have established the Kaadsiddheshwar temple and math in the 7th century CE. Other accounts mention a history of "more than 1300 years", and the 14th century CE, when a Lingayat Priest established a Shivling at the hill, which became Kaneri Math.

It is located on Siddhagiri hill in Kanheri village, Karveer tehsil, Kolhapur district, Maharashtra state, India. It is also called  "Siddhagiri Math" The Siddhagiri Math was established around the Moola-Kaadsiddheswar Shiva temple in the Shaiva-Lingayat tradition. It is a vast campus with the central Shiva temple.

In the 12th century the Math came under the influence of Basaveshwar, who established the Lingayat tradition of south India. Nowadays the influence of the math exceeds to most of the districts of Maharashtra and Karnataka, and also to some places in Madhya Pradesh and Andhra Pradesh.

Part of Siddhagiri Math is the "Siddhagiri Gramjivan Museum", a wax museum dedicated to Gandhi's ideal of rural life. It was established by the 27th Mathadhipati, H.H. Adrushya Kadsiddheshwar Swami Ji.

Waarshik Maha Utsava (Annual Ceremony) is being celebrated continuously for 3 days over here and the said practice is observed in Revan Natha Darbar Kolhapur since 33 years regularly with all joy.

All spiritual rituals of Natha Sampradaya are being arranged. The Annual ceremony comes in Margashirsha, Vadya Ashthami Navami and Dashami as per Hindu calendar which normally comes in the month of December every year as per English calendar.

Besides Annual Maha Utsava, the other important Utsavas like Guru Pornima, Shri Krishnashtami are also celebrated in Revan Natha Darbara enthusiastically. Spiritual guidance is being rendered to the devotees in Revan Natha Darbar Kolhapur.

Other temples
 Revansiddha Temple was built in the 16th century and lies hardly three furlongs away from the village Renavi.
 Sidhhanath Temple, Kharsundi is of a relative recent origin, being built 150 years ago.
 Lord Bhoodsidhhanath Mandir is located in Bhood, Maharashtra.

Sampradaya

Inchegeri Sampradaya
The Inchegeri Sampradaya honours Revan Natha as the (mythological) founder of their sampradaya.

See also
 Shaivism
 84 Mahasiddhas

Notes

References

Sources

External links
 Swami Dayanand Seva Ashram, About the Nath Lineage 
 shrihalsidhanath.com, Shankar Mama Shipurkar

Hinduism in Maharashtra
Inchegeri Sampradaya
Marathi Hindu saints
Navnath